Berkhamsted is a historic market town in Hertfordshire, England, in the Bulbourne valley,  north-west of London. The town is a civil parish with a town council within the borough of Dacorum which is based in the neighbouring large new town of Hemel Hempstead. Berkhamsted, along with the adjoining village of Northchurch, is encircled by countryside, much of it in the Chiltern Hills which is an Area of Outstanding Natural Beauty (AONB).

The High Street is on a pre-Roman route known by its Saxon name: Akeman Street. The earliest written reference to Berkhamsted was in 970. The settlement was recorded as a burbium (ancient borough) in the Domesday Book in 1086. The most notable event in the town's history occurred in December 1066. After William the Conqueror defeated King Harold's Anglo-Saxon army at the Battle of Hastings, the Anglo-Saxon leadership surrendered to the Norman encampment at Berkhamsted. The event was recorded in the Anglo-Saxon Chronicle. From 1066 to 1495, Berkhamsted Castle was a favoured residence of royalty and notable historical figures, including Henry II, Edward, the Black Prince, Thomas Becket and Geoffrey Chaucer. In the 13th and 14th centuries, the town was a wool trading town, with a thriving local market. The oldest known extant jettied timber-framed building in Great Britain, built between 1277 and 1297, survives as a shop on the town's high street.

After the castle was abandoned in 1495, the town went into decline, losing its borough status in the second half of the 17th century. Colonel Daniel Axtell, captain of the Parliamentary Guard at the trial and execution of Charles I in 1649, was among those born in Berkhamsted. Modern Berkhamsted began to expand after the canal and the railway were built in the 19th century. In the 21st century, Berkhamsted has evolved into an affluent commuter town.

The town's literary connections include the 17th-century hymnist and poet William Cowper, the 18th-century writer Maria Edgeworth and the 20th-century novelist Graham Greene. Arts institutions in the town include The Rex (a well regarded independent cinema) and the British Film Institute's BFI National Archive at King's Hill, which is one of the largest film and television archives in the world. Schools in the town include Berkhamsted School, a co-educational boarding independent school (founded in 1541 by John Incent, Dean of St Paul's Cathedral); Ashlyns School a state school, whose history began as the Foundling Hospital established in London by Thomas Coram in 1742; and Ashridge Executive Education, a business school offering degree level courses, which occupies the Grade I listed neo-Gothic Ashridge House.

History

Origin of the town's name

The earliest recorded spelling of the town's name is the 10th century Anglo-Saxon Beorhðanstædæ. The first part may have originated from either the Old English words beorg, meaning "hill", or berc or beorc, meaning "birch"; or from the older Old Celtic word Bearroc, meaning "hilly place". The latter part, "hamsted", derives from the Old English word for homestead. So the town's name could be either mean "homestead amongst the hills" or the "homestead among the birches".

Through history spellings of the town's name have changed. Local historian Rev John Wolstenholme Cobb identified over 50 different versions of the town's name since the writing of the Domesday Book (such as: "Berkstead", "Berkampsted", "Berkhampstead", "Muche Barkhamstede", "Berkhamsted Magna", "Great Berkhamsteed" and "Berkhamstead".)  The present spelling was officially adopted in 1937 when the local council formally changed its name from Great Berkhampstead to Berkhamsted. The town's local nickname is "Berko".

Prehistory and Roman period

 Neolithic, Bronze Age, Iron Age and Roman artefacts show that the Berkhamsted area of the Bulbourne Valley has been settled for over 5,000 years. The discovery of a large number of worked flint chips provides Neolithic evidence of on-site flint knapping in the centre of Berkhamsted. Several settlements dating from the Neolithic to the Iron Age (about 4500–100 BC) have been discovered south of Berkhamsted. Another Iron Age dyke with the same name is on Berkhamsted Common, on the north side of the valley.

In the late Iron Age, before the Roman occupation, the valley would have been within Catuvellauni territory. The Bulbourne Valley was rich in timber and iron ore. In the late Iron Age, a  area around Northchurch became a major iron production centre, now considered to be one of the most important late Iron Age and Roman industrial areas in England. Four Roman first century AD iron smelting bloomeries at Dellfield ( northwest of the town centre) provide evidence of industrial activity in Berkhamsted. Production ceased at the end of the Roman period. Other evidence of Roman-British occupation and activity in the Berkhamsted area, includes a pottery kiln on Bridgewater Road. The town's high street still follows the line of the Roman-engineered Akeman Street, which had been a pre-existing route from St Albans (Verulamium) to Cirencester (Corinium).

During Roman occupation the countryside close to Verulamium was subdivided into a series of farming estates. The Berkhamsted area appears to have been divided into two or three farming estates, each including one or more masonry villa buildings, with tiled roofs and underfloor heating.
The remains of a villa were found close to the river in 1973 in the adjacent village of Northchurch. The oldest building, made of timber, was built in AD 60, rebuilt using stone in the early 2nd century, and enlarged to a ten-room building around AD 150. The house may have been empty for a period, reoccupied in the 4th century, and abandoned in the late 4th or early 5th century.
A Roman-British villa, dyke, and temple were found  NNW of the castle, near Frithesden, at the edge of the Berkhamsted Golf Course. Excavations in 1954 revealed masonry foundations and tesserae floors. Together, the villa, dyke and temple form a unique complex, suggesting occupation in the late Iron Age and Roman period.
Two flint and tile walls from a Roman building were found north of Berkhamsted Castle in 1970. The construction of the castle's earthworks in the Middle Ages may have damaged this building.

Anglo-Saxon settlement

The earliest written reference to Berkhamsted is in the will of Ælfgifu (died AD 970), queen consort of King Eadwig of England (r. 955–959), who bequeathed large estates in five counties, including Berkhamsted. The location and extent of early Saxon settlement of Berkhamsted is not clear. Rare Anglo-Saxon pottery dating from the 7th century onwards has been found between Chesham Road and St John's Well Lane, with water mills near Mill Street in use from the late 9th century, show that an Anglo-Saxon settlement existed in the centre of modern-day Berkhamsted. The nearest known structural evidence of the Anglo-Saxon period are in the south and west walls of St Mary's Northchurch,  to the north-west of modern Berkhamsted. The church may have been an important minster, attached to a high status Anglo-Saxon estate, which became part of the medieval manor of Berkhamsted after the Norman conquest.

The parish of Berkhamsted St Mary's (in Northchurch) once stretched  from the hamlet of Dudswell, through Northchurch and Berkhamsted to the former hamlet of Bourne End. Within Berkhamsted, the Chapel of St James was a small church near St John's Well (a 'holy well' that was the town's principal source of drinking water in the Middle Ages). The parish of this church (and later that of St Peter's) was an enclave of about  surrounded by Berkhamsted St Mary's parish. By the 14th century the adjoining village of "Berkhamsted St Mary" or "Berkhamsted Minor" name had become "North Church", later "Northchurch", to distinguish the village from the town of Berkhamsted.

1066 and the Domesday survey

The Anglo-Saxons surrendered the crown of England to William the Conqueror at Berkhamsted in early December 1066. After William defeated and killed Harold II at the Battle of Hastings in October, he failed in an attempt to capture London from the south. William led his army around London, crossing the River Thames at Wallingford, "laying waste" while travelling through southeast England. At Berkhamsted, he received the surrender of Edgar the Ætheling (heir to the English throne), Archbishop Ealdred, Earl Edwin, Earl Morcar and the leaders of London. It is not known why the town was chosen as the meeting place, except that it was in a defensive location north-west of London. William was crowned in Westminster Abbey on Christmas Day, 1066. After his coronation, William granted the "Honour of Berkhamsted" to his half-brother, Robert, Count of Mortain, who after William became the largest landholder in the country. Robert built a wooden fortification that later became a royal retreat for the monarchs of the Norman and Plantagenet dynasties.

According to the Domesday Book, the lord of Berkhamsted before the Norman conquest was Edmer Ator (also referred to as Eadmer Atule), thegn of Edward the Confessor and King Harold. The Domesday survey records that there was enough land for 26 plough teams, but only 15 working teams. There were two flour mills (Upper and Lower Mill), woodland for 1,000 pigs, and a vineyard. The total population was calculated to be either 37 or 88 households; the families included 14 villagers, 15 smallholders, 6 slaves, a priest, a dyke builder (possibly working on the earthworks of the castle) and 52 burgesses. Some historians have argued that the number of 52 burgesses in Berkhamsted was a clerical error, as it is a large number for a small town. Berkhamsted was described in the Domesday Book as a burbium (ancient borough) in the Tring Hundred.() Marjorie Chibnall argued that Robert, Count of Mortain intended Berkhamsted to be both a commercial and a defensive centre; while John Hatcher and Edward Miller believed that the 52 burgesses were involved in trade, but it is unknown if the burgesses existed before the conquest.

Royal medieval castle (11th to 15th centuries)

Berkhamsted Castle is a (now ruined) motte-and-bailey Norman castle. Radiocarbon dating of organic remains from within the motte indicates that it was probably built post-1066 (a dyke builder is recorded in the town at the time of the Domesday Book). The castle was a high-status residence and an administrative centre for large estates (including the Earldom of Cornwall). Through the High and Late Middle Ages the close proximity of the royal castle and court helped fuel Berkhamsted's growth, prosperity and sense of importance. It created jobs for the local population, both within the castle itself and also, for example, in the large deer park and in the vineyard, which were maintained alongside the castle.

After Robert, Count of Mortain, the castle passed to his heir William, who rebelled against Henry I and lost the castle to the king. In 1155 Henry in turn gave it to his favourite Thomas Becket, who held it till 1165. Becket was later alleged to have spent over £300 on improvements to the castle, a claim that led Henry to accuse him of corruption and may have contributed to his downfall. Henry II extensively used the castle, making it one of his favourite residences. Both King Richard I and King John gave the castle to their queens, Berengaria of Navarre and Isabella of Angoulême, respectively. In King John's reign, Geoffrey Fitz Peter (c. 1162–1213), Earl of Essex and the Chief Justiciar of England (effectively the king's principal minister) held the Honour and Manor of Berkhamsted from 1199 to 1212. During his time in the castle he was responsible for the foundation of the new parish church of St Peter (the size of which reflects the growing prosperity of the town); two hospitals, St John the Baptist and St John the Evangelist (one of which was a leper hospital), which survived until 1516; and for the layout of the town.

Following the signing of Magna Carta (1215), King John's reneging on the royal charter, the castle was besieged during the ensuing civil war, known as the First Barons' War, between John and barons supported by Prince Louis (the future Louis VIII of France), the French laid siege to Berkhamsted Castle (only a quarter of a mile from the town centre) in late December 1216. The queen's constable of the castle was the German Walerand Teutonicus.

<blockquote>
After reducing the castle of Hertford, Louis marched on St Nicholas's day (6 December) to the castle of Berkhamsted and surrounded it with his engines of war. Whilst the English barons, after pitching their tents, were employed in setting them in order, the knights and soldiers of the garrison made a sally, seized the baggage and conveyances of the barons and gained possession of the standard of William de Mandeville with which they returned to the castle, regretting that they could do no further injury to them. On the same day, whilst the barons were sitting at table, the knights and soldiers of the garrison again made a sally, and, in order to put the barons in confusion, they carried before them the standard which they had taken a short time before, and thought to come on them unawares, but the latter were forewarned of this, and drove them back to the castle. When the following day dawned Louis ordered the petrarie (stone-throwing machines) and other engines of war to be erected around the city, which being done, they kept up a destructive shower of stones: but Waleran, a German, well tried in warfare, made a brave resistance against them and caused great slaughter amongst the excommunicated French.</p>—The contemporary chronicler, Roger of Wendover, based at St Albans abbey, 12 miles from Berkhamsted, describing the siege</p></blockquote>

During the siege, Prince Louis introduced a new destructive siege engine to England at Berkhamsted, the counterweight trebuchet (or mangonel). After a siege of twenty days the young new King (Henry III) ordered his constable to surrender the castle to Louis on 20 December. Following the siege at Berkhamsted Louis suffered several defeats. 11 September 1217 Louis signed the Treaty of Lambeth, relinquishing his claim to the English throne and surrendering French-held castles including Berkhamsted. Walerand went on to hold several other posts including the senior position of  Lord Warden of the Cinque Ports.

In 1227, Henry III's younger brother, Richard of Cornwall, was given the manor and castle, beginning the long association of the castle with the Earls and later the Dukes of Cornwall.  Richard redeveloped the castle as a palatial residence and the centre for the administration of the Earldom of Cornwall. Richard's coat of arms as Earl of Cornwall, along with bezants, is included in Berkhamsted's coat of arms. Richard's wife, Sanchia of Provence, died in the castle in 1260. Richard was succeeded by his son, Edmund, 2nd Earl of Cornwall, who founded Ashridge Priory, a college of the monastic order of Bonhommes, in 1283. In 1300, after Edmund died, Edward I took the castle; he subsequently granted it to his second queen, Margaret of France. In 1309, Edward I's and Margaret's son, Edward II, granted Berkhamsted to his favourite, Piers Gaveston. In 1317, the castle was given to Edward II's queen, Isabella of France.

Edward III further developed the castle and gave it (as part of the Duchy of Cornwall) to his son, Edward, the Black Prince, who expanded the hunting grounds. The castle was used to hold royal prisoners, including John II of France. In 1361, Edward the Black Prince and Joan, the Maid of Kent, spent their honeymoon in Berkhamsted. Under Edward the Black Prince, Berkhamsted become a centre of English longbow archery. A decisive factor in the English victory at the Battle of Crécy (1346) was the introduction of this new weapon onto the Western European battlefield. The longbow was a superior weapon to the cumbersome and slower crossbow. The Berkhamsted bowmen successfully took part in this significant battle in medieval Western European history. The Black Prince was supported at the Battle of Crecy by local bowmen Everard Halsey, John Wood, Stephen of Champneys, Robert Whittingham, Edward le Bourne, Richard of Gaddesden and Henry of Berkhamsted (who was rewarded with 2d a day and appointed porter of Berkhamsted Castle after he saved the prince's baggage at the Battle of Poitiers). Richard II inherited Berkhamsted Castle in 1377 and gave it to his favourites, Robert de Vere and John Holland.

In 1400, Henry IV lived in the castle after he deposed Richard, and he used the castle to imprison others attempting to obtain the throne. During this time, Geoffrey Chaucer – later famous for writing The Canterbury Tales – oversaw renovation work on the castle in his role as Clerk of the Works at Berkhamsted. It is unknown how much time he spent at Berkhamsted, but he knew John of Gaddesden, who lived in nearby Little Gaddesden and was the model for the Doctor of Phisick in The Canterbury Tales. Henry V and Henry VI owned the castle, the latter making use of it until he was overthrown in 1461. In 1469, Edward IV gave the castle to his mother, Cecily Neville, Duchess of York. The arrival of Neville and her household at Berkhamsted had a significant social and financial impact on the town. Men and women from the town joined her service, such as Robert Incent who became her secretary and whose memorial brass can still be seen in St Peter’s Church in Berkhamsted. Mother to both Edward IV and Richard III, grandmother to Edward V, and mother in law to Henry VII, she was the last person to live in the castle.

Recent history of the castle
In 1833, the castle was the first building to receive statutory protection in the United Kingdom. In 1834, construction of the railway embankment demolished the castle's gatehouse and adjacent earthworks. Today the castle ruins are managed by a charitable trust, the Berkhamsted Castle Trust, in partnership with English Heritage, on behalf of the Duchy of Cornwall (which still officially owns the site), and are freely open to the public.

Medieval market town (12th to 15th centuries)
The town continued to develop separately on the old Akeman Street   to the south of the castle and to the west of St Peter's Church; with a triangle formed by Mill Street, Castle Street and Back Lane pointing towards the castle. In 1156, Henry II officially recognised Berkhamsted as a town in a royal charter, which confirmed the laws and customs enjoyed under Edward the Confessor, William I and Henry I, and freed the town's merchants from all tolls and dues. The charter also stated that no market could be set up within  of the town.
The town became a trading centre on an important trade route in the 12th and 13th centuries, and received more royal charters. In 1216, Henry III relieved the men and merchants of the town from all tolls and taxes everywhere in England, and the English Plantagenet possessions in France, Normandy, Aquitaine and Anjou. The growing wool trade brought prosperity to Berkhamsted from the 12th century until the early Tudor period. Four wealthy Berkhamsted wool merchants were amongst a group in Bruges to whom Edward III wrote in 1332, and Berkhamsted merchants sold cloth to the royal court.

In 1217, Henry III recognised by royal charter the town's oldest institution, Berkhamsted's pre-existing market. Trades within medieval Berkhamsted were extensive: early in the 13th century the town had a merchant, two painters, a goldsmith, a forester, two farriers, two tailors, a brewer of mead, a blacksmith, carpenters, wood turners, tool makers, a manufacturer of roofing tiles and wine producers. In the mid–13th century, a banker, the wealthy Abraham of Berkhamsted, financier to the Earl of Cornwall, lived in the town; this was unusual for a small town in a time of heightened persecution of Jews.

A 1290 taxation list mentions a brewer, a lead burner, a carpenter, leather workers, a fuller, a turner, a butcher, a fishmonger, a barber, an archer, a tailor, a cloth-napper, a miller, a cook, a seller of salt and a huntsman. At this time, larger houses of merchants and castle officials appeared on the south side of the high street (including 173 High Street, the oldest known extant jettied building in England). In 1307 Berkhamsted was a large town by English medieval standards with an estimated population of 2,000 to 2,500. In 1355, there were five butchers, two bakers, nine brewers, two cobblers, a pelter, a tanner, five cloth dyers, six wheelwrights, three smiths, six grain merchants, a skinner and a baker/butcher. In the 14th century, Berkhamsted (recorded as "Berchamstede") was considered to be one of the "best" market towns in the country. In 1440, there is a reference to lime kilns.

At the foundation of the abbey, the Earl donated a phial claimed to contain Christ's blood. Pilgrims from all over Europe passed through the town to see the holy relic. The abbey grew quite wealthy as a result. Edward I held parliament at the abbey in 1290 and spent Christmas there. Berkhamsted burgesses sent two members to parliament in 1320, 1338 and 1341, but the town was not represented again. In the 15th century, the town was reaffirmed as a borough by a royal charter granted by Edward IV (1442–1483), which decreed that no other market town was to be set up within .

Castle abandoned, the town in decline (16th to late 18th centuries)

In the 16th century, the town fell into decline after abandonment of the castle following the death of Cicely Neville, Duchess of York, in 1495, and the rise of the nearby town of Hemel Hempstead (which was granted a Charter of Incorporation by Henry VIII on 29 December 1539). The population of the town in 1563 has been estimated at only 545. In 1580, the castle ruins and the park were leased by Elizabeth I to Sir Edward Carey, for the nominal rent of one red rose each year. Stone from the castle was used to build Berkhamsted Place, a local school, and other buildings in the late 16th century. Brewing and maltings was noted as one of the town's principal industries in the reign of Elizabeth. Around 1583, a new market house was erected west of St Peter's Church at the end of Middle Row (alternatively named Le Shopperowe or Graball Row). The market house was destroyed in a fire in 1854.

In 1612, Berkhamsted Place was bought by Henry Frederick, Prince of Wales for £4,000. Henry died later that year, and bequeathed the house to his brother Charles (later King Charles I), who leased the property to his tutor, Thomas Murray, and his wife, Mary Murray, who had been his nurse and Lady of the Privy Chamber to the prince's mother. John Norden wrote in 1616 that the making of malt was then the principal trade of the town. In 1618, James I reaffirmed Berkhamsted's borough status with a charter. Following surveys in 1607 and 1612 the Duchy of Cornwall enclosed  from the Common (now known as Coldharbour farm) despite local opposition led by Rev Thomas Newman. In 1639 the Duchy tried to enclose a further  of the Berkhamsted and Northchurch Commons, but was prevented from doing so by William Edlyn of Norcott. The castle's park, which had reached  by 1627, was broken up over the next two decades, shrinking to only , to the benefit of local farmers. In 1643, Berkhamsted was visited by a violent pestilential fever.

Born in Berkhamsted, Colonel Daniel Axtell (1622 – 19 October 1660), a Baptist and a grocer's apprentice, played a zealous and prominent part in the English Civil War, both in England and in the Cromwellian conquest of Ireland. He participated as a lieutenant colonel in Pride's Purge of the Long Parliament (December 1648), arguably the only military coup d'état in English history, and commanded the Parliamentary Guard at the trial of King Charles I at Westminster Hall in 1649. During Cromwell's Protectorate, he appropriated Berkhamsted Place. Shortly after the Restoration of the monarchy under Charles II, the unrepentant Axtell was hanged, drawn and quartered as a regicide. After the Restoration, the town lost its charter granted by James I and its borough status. The surveyor of Hertfordshire recommended that a new tenant and army officers were needed at Berkhamsted Place "to govern the people much seduced of late by new doctrine preacht unto them by Axtell and his colleagues." The population of the town in 1640 and in the 1690s was estimated at 1075 and 767, respectively. The town was a centre of religious nonconformity from the 17th century: over a quarter of the town were Dissenters in the second half of the century, and in 1700, there were 400 Baptists recorded as living in Berkhamsted. Three more shops are mentioned in the row next to the church, and the Parliamentary Survey of 1653 suggests that the area near the Market House was used for butchery.

Development of the modern town (19th and 20th centuries)

19th century urban growth

In the 17th and 18th centuries Hemel Hempstead, with its thriving market, eclipsed Berkhamsted as the major town in the area. Georgian Berkhamsted barely extended beyond the medieval triangle and the High Street. With the coming of the Industrial Age, Berkhamsted was well placed at a gateway through the Chilterns, between the markets of London and the industrial Midlands. The town became a link in the growing network of roads, canals and railways. These developments led Berkhamsted's population to expand once again. In 1801, the population of St Peter's parish had been 1,690 and by 1831, this had risen to 2,369 (484 houses). An 1835 description of the town found that "the houses are mostly of brick, and irregularly built, but are interspersed with a fair proportion of handsome residences". The town's population increased as "hundreds of men arrived to build the railway line and needed lodging"; by 1851, the population was 3,395, From 1850 large estates around Berkhamsted were sold, allowing for housing expansion. In 1851 the Pilkington Manor estate, east of Castle Street, was sold, and the land developed both as an industrial area and for artisans' dwellings. In 1868 streets of middle-class villas began to appear on the hill south of the High Street. Lower Kings Road was built by public subscription in 1885 to join Kings Road and the High Street to the station. In 1887, John Bartholomew's Gazetteer of the British Isles recorded the population at 4,485.

19th century industry and utilities

Industries in the 19th century included:
Timber: In the mid-18th century, Berkhamsted had been noted for turned wood products. Based on the extensive woodland resources of the area (principally alder and beech), the milling and turning of wood was the town's most prominent industry in the 19th century. The Crimean War contracts for supplying the army with lance poles and tent pegs led to major expansion. The largest manufacturer was East & Sons.
Brush making: An offshoot of the timber industry. The largest employers were Goss Brushworks at the west end of the High Street (closed 1930s) and T.H. Nash in George Street (closed 1920s).
The Canal trade provided a considerable economic stimulus to the town, enabling the development of industries which involved bulk transport of materials. These included timber and malt.
Boat building: Berkhamsted also became a centre for the construction of the barges needed for the canal trades. A yard for building canal barges and other boats, between Castle Street and Raven's Lane wharves, was one of three important boatyards in Hertfordshire. It was owned by John Hatton until 1880 and then by William Costin until 1910, when it was taken over by Key's, the timber merchants which in 1969 was bought by another timber merchant J. Alsford before being redeveloped into flats in 1994. At this site, next to the canal, is the Berkhamsted Canadian totem pole. 
Watercress: The construction of the canal had helped to drain the marshy areas along the valley of the River Bulbourne. In 1883, the Berkhamsted Times congratulated Mr Bedford on having converted the remaining "dirty ditches and offensive marshes" into watercress beds.
Chemical: Cooper's sheep dip works. William Cooper was a vet who arrived in Berkhamsted in the early 1840s and experimented in treatments for scab in sheep. He formulated an innovative arsenic and sulphur sheep-dip. The Cooper family firm was later inherited by his nephew, Sir Richard Cooper, 1st Baronet.
Nurserymen: Henry Lane's nurseryman business, founded in 1777, became one of the largest employers in the town in the 19th century. Extensive nurseries are shown on the 1878 Ordnance Survey 25 inch plan, at the western end of the town.
Iron working: Wood's Ironworks was set up in 1826 by James Wood.

Utilities in the 19th century included:
Gasworks: The Great Berkhamsted Gas, Light & Coke Co., at the junction of Water Lane and the Wilderness, was set up to provide street lighting in 1849. In 1906, the Berkhamsted Gas Works moved to Billet Lane; it closed in 1959.
Water and sewage: The Great Berkhamsted Waterworks Company was set up in 1864 on the High Street (on the present site of W.H. Smith and Boots). Mains drainage was first supplied in 1898–99, when effective sewerage was installed.

Provision for the destitute

In 1725 "An Account of Several Workhouses" records a parish workhouse in Berkhamsted, and a parliamentary report of 1777 refers to a parish workhouse for up to 34 inmates in Northchurch. A small "wretched, straw-thatched" house was used to house poor families in Berkhamsted, on the corner of what is now Park View Road, until it was demolished in the 1820s. In 1831 a bequest of £1,000 by the Revd George Nugent led to a new parish workhouse being set up on the site of a workhouse which had operated in a row of tenements on the High Street (at the Kitsbury Road junction) known as Ragged Row. The "Berkhampstead Poor Law Union" was formed in June 1835 covering ten parishes centred on the town. The Union took over the existing Berkhamsted parish workhouse, and by August 1835 it had become the sole workhouse for the union. The workhouse had no schoolroom, so in 1849 the Poor Law Board recommended that pauper children be sent to the local National School. However in 1858 the school complained about the state of the children attending from the workhouse. A fever ward was erected in 1855, and a full-time nurse was engaged in 1868. The workhouse system officially came to an end in 1930, and control over the workhouse was given to local council. Nugent House, the Berkhamsted workhouse, finally closed in 1935 and its function was relocated to Hemel Hemspstead. In 1841, the Countess of Bridgewater built a soup kitchen for the local poor within the ruins of Berkhamsted Castle. The soup kitchen was used by an estimated 15 per cent of the population of Berkhamsted (about 500 people) during the winter months, until at least 1897. The building still stands connected to the cottage in the castle grounds; why it was placed outside the town and inside the ruins of the historic castle is unknown.

Land dispute: The Battle of Berkhamsted Common

The Battle of Berkhamsted Common played an important part in the preservation of common land nationally. After 1604 the former Ashridge Priory became the home of the Edgerton family. In 1808-1814 Francis Egerton, 3rd Duke of Bridgewater, demolished the old priory, and built a stately home, Ashridge House. In 1848 the estate passed to the Earls Brownlow, a branch of the Egerton family.

In 1866, Lord Brownlow of Ashridge House (encouraged by his mother, Lady Marian Alford) in an action similar to many other large estate holders tried to enclose Berkhamsted Common with  steel fences (built by Woods of Berkhamsted) in order to claim the land as part of his family's estate. In response to the enclosure action and in defence the historic right of the public to use the ancient common land, Augustus Smith MP and George Shaw-Lefevre organised local people and 120 hired men from London's East End to dismantle the fences on the night of 6 March, in what became known nationally as the Battle of Berkhamsted Common.

Lord Brownlow brought a legal case against Smith for trespass and criminal damage, Smith was aided in his defence by Sir Robert Hunter (later co-founder of the National Trust in 1895) and the Commons Preservation Society. Lord Justice Romilly determined that pulling down a fence was no more violent an act than erecting one. The case, he said, rested on the legality of Brownlow's action in building the fence and the legal right of people to use the land. He ruled in favour of Smith. This decision, along with the Metropolitan Commons Act 1866, helped to ensure the protection of Berkhamsted Common and other open spaces nationally threatened with enclosure. In 1926 the common was acquired by the National Trust.

First World War

During the First World War, under the guidance of Lt Col Francis Errington, the Inns of Court Officers' Training Corps trained men from the legal profession as officers. Over the course of the war, 12,000 men travelled from Berkhamsted to fight on the Western Front. Their training included trench digging:  of trenches were dug across the Common (of which  remain). The Inns of Court War Memorial on the Common has the motto Salus Populi Suprema Lex—the welfare of the people is the highest law—and states that the ashes of Colonel Errington were buried nearby.

20th century urban developments

In 1909 Sunnyside and later in 1935 Northchurch were added to Berkhamsted Urban District. Shortly after 1918 much of the extensive estate belonging to Berkhamsted Hall, at the east end of the High Street, was sold; many acres west of Swing Gate Lane were developed with council housing. More council housing was built at Gossoms End. Development on the north side of the valley was limited until the sale of the Ashridge estate in the 1930s, after which housing appeared at each end of Bridgewater Road. In the second half of the 20th century, many of the old industrial firms in Berkhamsted closed, while the numbers of commuters increased.

After the Second World War, in July 1946, the nearby town of Hemel Hempstead was designated a New Town under the New Towns Act ("New Towns" were satellite urban developments around London to relieve London's population growth and housing shortages caused by the Blitz). In February 1947 the Government purchased  of land and began construction. As a result Hemel Hempstead's population increased from 20,000 to over 90,000 today, making it the largest town in Hertfordshire. In 1974, the old hundred of Dacorum became the modern district of Dacorum formed under the Local Government Act 1972, based in Hemel Hempstead.

Geography

The valley is at the southernmost limit of the Pleistocene glaciation ice erosion throughout the Chiltern scarp, giving it a smooth rounded appearance, with alluvial soils in the valley bottom and chalk, clay and flint on the valley sides. In the early Mesolithic period (Middle Stone Age, mid to late 8th millennium BC), the local upland was mostly pine woodland and the low area of central Berkhamsted probably a grass-sedge fen. In the 6th Millennium BC the dense deciduous forest became well established. By the Mid to late 3rd millennium BC during the Neolithic period (the New Stone Age) human activity can be seen in wood clearances; the woodland being then dominated by lime trees, with alder trees growing on the flood plain. Rich in eels and other fish, it was fast-moving and full, and prone to frequent localised flooding. The river created a marsh environment (at times referred to as an 'unhealthy swamp') in the centre of the valley. The river powered the watermills (recorded in 1086) and fed the three moats of the large Norman Motte and Bailey castle, that stands close to the centre of the town where a small dry combe joins the Bulbourne valley. 

The countryside surrounding the town includes parts of the Green Belt and the Chilterns Area of Outstanding Natural Beauty. The Urban Nature Conservation Study (UNCS) recognises the town's hinterland as a biodiversity resource. The hills gently rise to an undulating and open plateau, which has a mix of arable farmland, common land and mixed oak, ash and beech woodland. Ownership of Berkhamsted Common is divided between the National Trust and Berkhamsted Golf Club. Beyond the common is the  historic wooded parkland of Ashridge; once part of Berkhamsted Castle's hunting park, it is now managed by the National Trust. Ashridge is part of the Chilterns Beechwood Special Area of Conservation (SAC), a nationally important nature conservation area, and is also designated as a Site of Special Scientific Interest. Agriculture is more dominant to the south of the town; close to the Buckinghamshire border there are two former large country estates, Ashlyns and Rossway. The ancient woodland at Dickshills is also located here.

The layout of Berkhamsted's centre is typical of a medieval market settlement: the linear High Street (aligned on the Akeman Street) forms the spine of the town (roughly aligned east–west), from which extend medieval burgage plots (to the north and south). The surviving burgage plot layout is the result of a comprehensive plan carried out at the beginning of the 13th century, most probably instigated by Geoffrey fitz Peter. The town centre slowly developed over the years and contains a wide variety of properties that date from the 13th century onwards. The modern town began to develop after the construction of the Grand Junction Canal in 1798. The canal intersects the river at numerous points, taking most of its water supply and helping to drain the valley. The locality became further urbanised when the London to Birmingham railway was built in 1836–37. The townscape was shaped by the Bulbourne valley, which rises  on either side at its narrowest point; the residential area is elongated and follows the valley's topography. The southwest side of the valley is more developed, with side streets running up the steep hillside; on the northeast side, the ground gently slopes down to the castle, railway, canal and small river, was less available for development. Today, Berkhamsted is an affluent, "pleasant town tucked in a wooded fold in the Chiltern Hills"; with a large section of the settlement protected as a conservation area.

Neighbouring settlements
Traveling on the high street away from the town, along the Bulbourne valley south-eastwards towards London, the A4251 road passes through the village of Bourne End and the large new town of Hemel Hempstead ( distant). To the south south-east is the large village of Bovingdon. Taking the  A416 road south from Berkhamsted, along the Chiltern Hills into Buckinghamshire lies the nearby hamlet of Ashley Green and the fellow market towns of Chesham ( distant) and Amersham. Further southwest is the village of Great Missenden and to the west is the small market town of Wendover.

Along the A4251 and valley northwestwards is the adjoining village of Northchurch, and the hamlets of Dudswell and Cow Roast, the village of Wigginton and the small market town of Tring ( distant) and the county town of Buckinghamshire Aylesbury at ( distant). Following the Chiltern Hills northwards, to the north-northwest is the village of Aldbury; situated to the north of Berkhamsted are the villages of Ringshall and Little Gaddesden ( distant); finally located to the north-east of the town are the villages and hamlets of Potten End, Frithsden and Great Gaddesden. The nearest large settlements to the north of Berkhamsted are the Bedfordshire towns of Dunstable ( distant) and Luton (.

Climate
Like most of the United Kingdom, Berkhamsted has an oceanic climate (Köppen climate classification Cfb).

Near-real-time weather information can be retrieved from Berkhamsted Weather Station page on the Met Office Weather Observation website.

Governance
Berkhamsted is within the South West Hertfordshire, UK Parliament constituency. Following the 2019 United Kingdom general election Gagan Mohindra (Conservative Party) is the constituency's current Member of Parliament (MP).

Berkhamsted has a town council, the first tier of local government that represents the local people to two higher tiers of local government, Dacorum Borough Council and Hertfordshire County Council. The modern district of Dacorum based in Hemel Hempstead was formed in 1974 under the Local Government Act 1972; the local government district's main population centres include Hemel Hempstead, Tring and the western part of Kings Langley. Berkhamsted accounts for just over 12 per cent of the district's population of 153,300 in 2017.

Berkhamsted is split into three local government Wards—East, West and Castle. In the 2015 town council elections the political composition of the council was Conservative 12; Liberal Democrat 3.  Following the 2019 town council elections the political composition of the council changed to Liberal Democrat 10; Conservative 3; Green 2. In the 2021 local elections on 6 May, the Berkhamsted seat at Hertfordshire County Council was won with 51.8 per cent of the vote by the Liberal Democrat Nigel Taylor, compared to the Conservative vote of 29.8per cent.

Administrative history
Berkhamsted was an ancient borough, but lost this status in the seventeenth century. The town was then governed by its parish vestry until the nineteenth century, in the same way as most rural areas. In 1835 Berkhamsted was made the centre of a poor law union which covered the town and the surrounding parts of western Hertfordshire, as well as parts of Buckinghamshire. Under the Public Health Act 1872, sanitary districts were created, and the boards of guardians of poor law unions were made responsible for public health and local government for any part of their district not included in an urban authority. As Berkhamsted had no local board or other urban authority, it was therefore included in the rural sanitary district.

In 1893 the town petitioned for the creation of a local board covering both Berkhamsted and Northchurch parishes, which would make it independent of the rural sanitary authority. An inquiry was held by a government inspector in December 1893, but he advised against the scheme. Hertfordshire County Council therefore did not pursue it, although did comment that an urban authority covering just the town itself rather than the two whole parishes might be more favourably received.

Under the Local Government Act 1894, rural sanitary districts became rural districts on 28 December 1894, and so the town became part of the Berkhampstead Rural District. Parish councils were also established under the act, to take over the civil functions of the old vestries. The new parish councils came into being on 31 December 1894 if an election had been needed to choose the first parish councillors, as was the case at Berkhamsted. The first meeting of the parish council was held on 31 December 1894 at the Town Hall in Berkhamsted, with the first chairman of the parish council being Arthur Johnson, who was the rector of St Peter's Church in the town.

Berkhamsted Urban District (18981974)

Efforts to make the town independent of the rural district council continued. Eventually it was agreed that the parish would be split into a "Great Berkhampstead Urban" parish, which would become an urban district, and a "Great Berkhampstead Rural" parish, which would remain in the Berkhampstead Rural District. These changes came into force on 15 April 1898. The first meeting of the Great Berkhampstead Urban District Council was held on 15 April 1898, with David Osborn being elected the council's first chairman. The Great Berkhampstead Rural parish ceded land to the urban district in 1935 and was abolished two years later, being split between Nettleden with Potten End, Northchurch, and Great Gaddesden on 1 April 1937.

In 1908 the urban district council acquired a builder's yard and former Wesleyan chapel at 135 High Street (renumbered 161 High Street around 1950) to act as its offices and meeting place. By the 1930s the council needed more space. In 1936 the council bought the shop adjoining the old chapel. Both buildings were demolished and the new Berkhamsted Civic Centre was built on the site, which formally opened on 14 October 1938.

Until 1937 the official name of the council's area was the "Great Berkhampstead Urban District". At a meeting on 15 April 1937 the council discussed whether to change the name. It was commented that the inclusion of the "Great" in particular caused problems for people looking for the council's telephone number in the directory. The spelling "Berkhamsted" was also the more commonly used by this time. The change of name to "Berkhamsted Urban District" was agreed, and came into effect on 19 July 1937. The neighbouring Berkhampstead Rural District followed suit a few months later, becoming Berkhamsted Rural District on 1 November 1937.

Berkhamsted Urban District was abolished under the Local Government Act 1972, becoming part of the district of Dacorum on 1 April 1974. Berkhamsted Town Council was created as a successor parish to the old urban district council. The town council continues to be based at the Civic Centre at 161 High Street.

Demography

Homes
The Hertfordshire Local Information System (HertsLIS) website (based on data from the Office for National Statistics and other UK government departments) has the following data regarding the 7,363 households in Berkhamsted in 2011. 72 per cent of homes were owner occupied (34 per cent owned outright and 38 per cent owned with a mortgage) compared to 63 per cent for England. 26.5 per cent of homes were rented (13 per cent each for social rented and private rented) compared to a national figure of 34.5 per cent. In 2011, 77 per cent of household spaces in Berkhamsted were houses or bungalows and 23 per cent were flats or maisonettes. 30 per cent of houses and bungalows were detached compared to 22 per cent nationally: 47 per cent of dwellings are semi-detached or terraced, compared to 55 per cent nationally. According to HertsLIS in the third quarter of 2017 the average price of houses and flats in Berkhamsted was £724,900, compared to £474,400 for Hertfordshire, and £304,500 for England. Detached houses were £1,070,600 compared to £424,400 nationally. Berkhamsted was shown as the best place to live in southeast England in the Sunday Times 'Best Places to Live 2018' list, with the average prices of different types of homes in Berkhamsted ranging from £273,760 for starter homes to £999,920 for family homes, with rents from £850 to £2,490 per calendar month.

In 2021 according to Rightmove the average cost of a home in Berkhamsted was £696,949. The majority of sales in the town were detached properties, with an average selling value of £1,076,244. The average terraced dwelling price was £563,291 and the average semi-detached properties went for £657,436. Overall, in 2021 property house prices in Berkhamsted were four per cent up on the previous year and five per cent up on the 2018 peak of £661,336.

Employment and economic wellbeing
In mid-2016, the Office for National Statistics estimated the working age population of Berkhamsted (males and females aged 16 to 64) as 11,400, i.e. 62 per cent of the town's population. People from Berkhamsted were employed as follows: 17.5 per cent worked as managers, directors and senior officials; 27.5 per cent professional occupations and 8.5 per cent in associate professional and technical occupations; 10 per cent were employed in administrative and secretarial occupations; 7 per cent in skilled trades; 6 per cent Caring, leisure and other service occupations; 5 per cent were in sales and customer service occupations; 3 per cent were in process, plant and machine operatives; and 5.5 per cent worked in elementary occupations.

According to HertsLIS in 2011, 76 per cent of Berkhamsted residents between the ages of 16 and 74 were employed (of which: full-time, 43 per cent; part-time, 13 per cent; self-employed, 14 per cent); and 24 per cent economically inactive (retired, 13 per cent; long-term sick/disabled, 2 per cent). 1.5 per cent of Berkhamsted households included a person with a long-term health problem or disability, while nationally this figure is 4.05 per cent. In April 2013, according to the Office for National Statistics on benefit claimants by constituency, the number of claimants on Jobseeker's Allowance (unemployment benefit) in Berkhamsted's South West Hertfordshire parliamentary constituency was 1.7 per cent, compared to 7.8 per cent for the UK.

Diversity
Looking at broad ethnic heritage in 2011, HertsLIS data found that 90 per cent of residents were described as white British. Of the remainder, 1 per cent were Irish, 4 per cent were of other white origin, 1.7 per cent were described as mixed or multiple ethnic, 2.1 per cent were Asian or Asian British, 0.3 per cent were black African/Caribbean or black British and 0.3 per cent were Arab or any other ethnic group. Regarding religious beliefs in 2011, of the 92 per cent of residents who stated a religious preference, 30 per cent were non-religious and 59 per cent were Christian; other faiths included 0.4 per cent Buddhist, 0.5 per cent Jewish, 0.5 per cent Muslim and 0.1 per cent Sikh.

Relationships and education
In 2011 the marital and civil partnership statuses of residents aged 16 and over were as follows: 28 per cent single, 56 per cent married, 0.1 per cent in a registered same-sex civil partnership, 2 per cent separated, 8 per cent divorced or legally dissolved same-sex civil partnership, and 6 per cent widowed or surviving partner from a same-sex civil partnership. Looking at the qualifications table, 12 per cent of residents had no qualifications, 10 per cent reached level 1, 13 per cent achieved level 2, 2 per cent had apprenticeship qualifications, 10 per cent were level 3 and 49 per cent achieved level 4 or above. In 2018 the Sunday Times found 76 per cent of young people went on to higher education.

Transport

Road
In 1762, this section of Akeman Street became part of the Sparrows Herne Turnpike Road, a main thoroughfare between London and Aylesbury; it was notorious for its rutted and pitted state, even after becoming a toll road. Many coaching inns thrived along its route, including, in Berkhamsted, the King's Arms (where the exiled King Louis XVIII of France carried on a romance with Polly Page, the innkeeper's daughter). The town's historic high street is now the A4251. A bypass, originally proposed in the 1930s, was opened in 1993 and the main A41 road now passes south-west of Berkhamsted. A study of car ownership in Berkhamsted, Northchurch and Tring found that 43–45 per cent of households had two or more cars, compared to the county average of 40 per cent and the national average of 29 per cent. Conversely, the proportion of households who did not own a car was 14–20 per cent (about 7 per cent lower than the national average). Local bus routes passing through Berkhamsted town centre provide links to Hemel Hempstead, Luton, Watford and Whipsnade Zoo. Services include the 30, 31, 62, 207, 500 (Aylesbury and Watford), 501, 502 and 532. Buses are managed by Hertfordshire County Council's Intalink transport service.

Canal

In 1798, the Grand Junction Canal (built by William Jessop) from the River Thames at Brentford reached Berkhamsted; it reached Birmingham in 1805. Castle Wharf, the port of Berkhamsted, on the south side of the canal between Ravens Lane and Castle Street, was the centre of the town's canal trade, navigation and boat building activities. It was a hub of the country's inland water transport system, linking the ports and industrial centres of the country. Goods transported included coal, grain, building materials and manure. Timber yards, boating wharves, breweries, boat building and chemical works flourished as a result of the canal, with over 700 workers employed locally. It is still known as the Port of Berkhamsted. Separately, Francis Egerton, 3rd Duke of Bridgewater (the "Canal Duke" and "father of the inland waterway system"), lived in Ashridge, near Berkhamsted. The canal became part of the Grand Union Canal in 1929.

Railway

In 1834, after opposition from turnpike trusts and local landowners was resolved, the first Berkhamsted railway station was built by chief engineer Robert Stephenson. Though the castle was the first building to receive statutory protection from Parliament, the railway embankment obliterated the old castle barbican and adjacent earthworks. Most of the raw materials used to build the railway were transported by the canal. The present station was built in 1875 when the railway was widened. It is unusual, on its line, in that most of the original buildings have been retained. The 'large trunk station' is located immediately next to Berkhamsted Castle on one side and overlooks the Grand Junction Canal on the other.

One and a half million journeys are made annually to and from Berkhamsted, the vast majority by commuters to and from London. Southern also runs an hourly service direct to East Croydon, via .

Economy and commerce
In 1986, farming, service and light industry were characteristic local employers. In 2015, schools and retail (predominantly Waitrose) were the town's largest employers; these are both situated in Berkhamsted Castle ward. The Berkhamsted West ward (especially around Billet Lane, close to the canal and railway) is where most of the town's small to medium-sized industrial firms are located. The British Film Institute (BFI) is an important local employer to the south of Berkhamsted. As in many settlements, local industry has declined and more people commute elsewhere to work. Of the employed residents living in both Berkhamsted and Tring, 35 per cent live and work in the towns, while 65 per cent commute to workplaces away from the towns, particularly to London. Of the 7,100 people who work in Berkhamsted, 58 per cent commute to Berkhamsted to work. In 2011, 9.5 per cent of Berkhamsted residents (aged 16 to 74 in employment) worked mainly at or from home; 52 per cent drove to work by car (2.5 per cent as a passenger in a car); 22 per cent travelled by public transport; and 13 per cent cycled or walked to work. In 2011, an average commute to work was 21 kilometres.

In November 2014, the Academy of Urbanism's Urbanism Awards found Berkhamsted's High Street to be a "vibrant" and "bustling" road, which "worked extremely well as a quality high street." They considered the layout for the street to be exemplary for its time (it was put in place after the bypass was built in the early 1990s), creating a "pleasant" and "successful" shopping environment and providing a good "range of specialist shops and numerous cafes, restaurants and pubs", together with the "strong supermarket" offering set in "well-crafted re-configured streetscape". The long high street had 100 per cent retail occupancy, independent traders and a "cafe culture". The Academy considered the good working collaboration between individual businesses and the Chamber of Trade to be a particularly strong aspect of the street. In the 2017 Vitality Index of 1000 retail locations in the UK carried out by Harper Dennis Hobbs, Berkhamsted was ranked as the 16th best shopping location in the country; in 2021, it ranked 9th. The index measured the quality of retail locations, including factors such as how well the retail mix met the needs of the local community, the number of vacant shops, and the proportion of 'undesirable' shops such as pawnbrokers and bookmakers. Coming top in the south-east region in Sunday Times 2018 Best Places to Live, Berkhamsted was described as "affluent and attractive; its medieval centre is filled with chic shops and great places to eat", with 76 per cent of shops being independent stores. Berkhamsted has an active Transition Town community.

Education

Independent schools
Berkhamsted School is a private public school. It was founded in 1541 by Dean John Incent, ( 1480–1545) Born in Berkhamsted circa 1480, John Incent was the Dean of St Paul's Cathedral in London from 1540 to 1545 (during the early years of the English Reformation).

Incent was noted as one of the agents of the Lord Chancellor Thomas Cromwell responsible for the sequestration of religious properties during the Dissolution of the Monasteries Incent financed the foundation of Berkhamsted school from the combined revenues of the town's two medieval hospitals, St John the Baptist and St John the Evangelist, which he had closed down in 1516. In 1523 he took the lands of the two former hospitals and joined them to his own land, donating the enlarged estate towards the creation of a school. In 1541 he obtained a royal charter for "one chauntry perpetual and schools for boys not exceeding 144 to be called Dean Incent's Free School in Berkhamstedde". John Incent died intestate 18 months after his school opened. To protect the school from legal challenges, school was incorporated by an Act of Parliament as The Free Schole of King Edwarde the Sixte in Berkhampstedde. Amongst the school's former students was the author Graham Greene. The school's oldest building, the Old Hall, was built in 1544 and is Grade I listed. Contemporary records state that Incent "builded with all speed a fair schoole lartge and great all of brick very sumptuously", and "when ye said school was thus finished, ye Deane sent for ye cheafe men of ye towne into ye school where he kneeling gave thanks to Almighty God". In 1988 the school merged with Berkhamsted School for Girls (another large independent private school in the town), which had been founded in 1888. The school has 1,500 fee paying pupils, aged 3 to 18.

Egerton Rothesay School, an independent school founded in 1922, has 150 pupils between the ages of 5 and 19.

State schools

In the 1970s, the town adopted a three-tier state school education system, but reverted to the two-tier system of primary and secondary schools in 2013.

Primary schools are: Victoria (founded in 1838), Bridgewater, Greenway, St Thomas More, Swing Gate, Thomas Coram and Westfield. The secondary school is Ashlyns School, a Foundation school with 1,200 pupils aged 11 to 19 years; it is a specialist language college. The school started in the 18th century, when Thomas Coram, a philanthropic ship's captain, was appalled by the abandoned babies and children starving and dying in London. He campaigned for a hospital to accommodate them and was successfully granted a royal charter "for the Maintenance and Education of Exposed and Deserted Children" in 1739. Three years later, in 1742, he established the Foundling Hospital at Lamb's Conduit Fields in Bloomsbury, London. It was the first children's charity in the country and a precedent for incorporated associational charities everywhere. The school moved to its purpose-built location in Berkhamsted in 1935. The residential home side at Berkhamsted closed following the Children Act 1948, when family-centred care replaced institutional care. In 1951 Hertfordshire County Council took over running the school. The large school contains stained glass windows, especially around the chapel, a staircase and many monuments from the original London hospital. The school's chapel formerly housed an organ donated by George Frideric Handel. The school was used a backdrop to the 2007 comedy film, Son of Rambow.

Business school
The house occupies the site of the earlier Ashridge Priory, a college of the monastic order of Bonhommes founded in 1283 by Edmund, 2nd Earl of Cornwall, who resided in the castle. After the Dissolution of the Monasteries, Henry VIII bequeathed the property to his daughter, Elizabeth. In 1800, it was the home of Francis Egerton, 3rd Duke of Bridgewater, affectionately known as the Father of Inland Navigation.Ashridge House  was constructed between 1808 and 1814 to a design by James Wyatt with later work by his nephew Jeffrey Wyattville. Architecture critic Nikolaus Pevsner described it as the "largest of the romantic palaces near London ... a spectacular composition". In 1928 Urban Hanlon Broughton purchased the house as a gift for the Conservative Party intended to commemorate Bonar Law. For its first 15 years, it became a "College of Citizenship" established to help the party develop its intellectual forces in struggles with socialist organisations such as the Fabian Society. It became a cross between a think-tank and a training centre, and Arthur Bryant was its educational adviser.

In 2015 Ashridge merged with Hult International Business School, an American business school with campuses in seven cities around the world. Its activities include open and tailored executive education programmes, MBA, MSc and Diploma qualifications, organisation consulting, applied research and online learning. Ashridge is the only UK specialist business school with degree awarding powers, giving it the equivalent status to a university in awarding its degrees.

Religious sites

The oldest extant church locally is St Mary's in the adjacent village of Northchurch. Between 1087 and 1104, there is reference to a chaplain called Godfrey and to a chapel of St James with parochial status within St Mary's Berkhamsted's parish. The chapel situated close to St Johns, located close to St John's Lane, was the base for a small community of monks, the Brotherhood of St John the Baptist, in the 11th and 12th centuries.

During King John's reign, Geoffrey Fitz Peter, was instrumental in the foundation the parish church of St Peter, and in 1222, Robert de Tuardo, was registered as the first known rector. Because of the church's proximity to the castle, the reigning monarch was patron of Berkhamsted rectors for several centuries. In 1648, St Peter's Church was requisitioned during the English Civil War by General Fairfax as a military prison to hold soldiers captured from the siege of Colchester. The poet William Cowper was christened in St Peter's, where his father John Cowper was rector.

The parish church of St Peter, which stands on the high street, is one of the largest churches in Hertfordshire. The oldest part of the church is the chancel, which is dated at c. 1200; it is in the Early English style common in that period. Further additions were made up until the 15th century; in 1871, it underwent a restoration by William Butterfield. There are two altar tombs with alabaster effigies dating from the 14th century: the tombs are of a knight (thought to be Henry of Berkhamsted, one of the Black Prince's lieutenants at the Battle of Crecy) and his lady. There are two other Anglican churches in the town – 'St Michael and All Angels' (Sunnyside)(original building 1886) and 'All Saints' Church & St Martha's' (built in 1906, to cater for the growing population in the west end of the town). In 1842 a detached churchyard to St Peter's Church was established, using land to the rear of Egerton House (where the Rex cinema now stands) on Rectory Lane. It expanded to 3.275 acres and was phased out of use in 1976.

The town has a strong Non-conformist tradition, in 1672 a survey found that there were 400 Anglian conformists and 150 Non-conformists in Berkhamsted, when such beliefs could bring you foul of the law. The Baptist community in Berkhamsted, dates from 1640 making it one of the oldest nationally; first gathering in secret, they built a large chapel in 1722, and moved to their current place of worship at the junction of Ravens Lane on the High Street in 1864. A Quaker community is present in the town from the second half of the 17th century, they opened their Meeting House in 1818 on the High Street opposite St John's Well Lane. The Congregationlists can be traced back to 1780, they now worship combined with the Presbyterian church at St Andrew's United Reformed Church on the corner of Castle Street and Chapel Street. The Methodists arrived with the hundreds of men who came to build the railway, via various places of worship, today they share All Saints' Church with the Anglians. The Evangelist (Latter Day Saints) began life has part of the Plymouth Bretheren, their Hope Hall opened in 1875, which was rechristened the Kings Road Evangelical Church in 1969. The Roman Catholic tradition from the 17th to 20th century appears to be limited, General de Gaulle worshiped at their original Church of the Sacred Heart in Park View Road, they moved to a larger modern church in 1980 on Park Street.

Culture and leisure

Literary connections
Geoffrey Chaucer was clerk of works at Berkhamsted Castle from 1389 and based his Doctor of Phisick in The Canterbury Tales on John of Gaddesden, who lived in nearby Little Gaddesden. William Cowper was born in Berkhamsted Rectory in 1731. Although he moved away when still a boy, there are frequent references to the town in his poems and letters. In the Victorian era, Cowper became a cult figure and Berkhamsted was a place of pilgrimage for his devotees. Maria Edgeworth, a prolific Anglo-Irish writer of adults' and children's literature who was a significant figure in the evolution of the novel in Europe, lived in Berkhamsted as a child in the 18th century. Between 1904 and 1907, the Llewelyn Davies boys were the inspiration for the author and playwright J. M. Barrie's Peter Pan. A little later, novelist Graham Greene was born in Berkhamsted and educated at Berkhamsted School, alongside literary contemporaries Claud Cockburn, Peter Quennell, Humphrey Trevelyan and Cecil Parrott. Children's authors H. E. Todd and Hilda van Stockum both lived in Berkhamsted. The comic character Ed Reardon from Radio 4's semi-naturalistic radio drama Ed Reardon's Week resides in Berkhamsted.

Cinema

The Rex Cinema is regarded by some, including  The Daily Telegraph, as Britain's most beautiful cinema. Described by Dame Judi Dench as "absolutely awe-inspiring", in 2014, the Rex was declared Britain's Best Cinema in the inaugural Guardian film awards. Built in 1937 the Rex is recognised by English Heritage as a fine example of a 1930s art deco cinema. The cinema was designed by architect David Evelyn Nye for the Shipman and King circuit. Closed in 1988, the cinema was extensively restored in 2004 and has become a thriving independent local cinema. The Rex frequently has sold-out houses for evening showings, the cinema is a "movie palace with all the original art deco trimmings" (its interior features decorations of sea waves and shells). Inside is a step "back into the golden age of film" when going to the movies was an experience; the cinema features luxurious seating and two licensed bars. It is managed by its owner James Hannaway, who introduces films. Sometimes there is a question and answer session with directors and actors involved in the films; these sessions have included Dame Judi Dench, Charles Dance, Mike Leigh and Terry Jones.

Prior to the cinema's construction, an Elizabethan mansion, Egerton House, had occupied the site at the east end of the high street for 350 years. The house was occupied briefly (1904–07) by Arthur and Sylvia Llewelyn Davies, whose children were J. M. Barrie's inspiration for Peter Pan.

British Film Institute National Archive at King's Hill
Rarely open to the public, the BFI National Archive's "The J. Paul Getty, Jr. Conservation Centre" in Berkhamsted is the archive of the British Film Institute. With over 275,000 feature, non-fiction and short films (dating from 1894) and 210,000 television programmes, it is one of the largest film archives in the world. Two of the archive's collections were added to the United Nations Educational, Scientific and Cultural Organisation (UNESCO) UK Memory of the World Register, in 2011. The archive collects, preserves, restores and shares the films and television programmes which have shaped and recorded British life and times since the development of motion picture film in the late 19th century. The majority of the collection is British-originated material, but the archive also features internationally significant holdings from around the world and films that feature key British actors and the work of British directors.

Sport and outdoor pursuits
The town benefits in having a large National Trust Common and woodland on its long north east border. Running east–west through the centre of the town, along the town's length the Grand Union Canal (once an important trade artery) today it provides an open space with recreational opportunities, and acts with the small River Bulbourne as a wildlife corridor through the town. Other long standing public green spaces are the castle and Butts Meadow. In 2016 The Friends of St Peter's Berkhamsted received £907,000 in a grant from the Heritage Lottery Fund and the Big Lottery Fund from the National Lottery (United Kingdom) to repurpose the Rectory Lane Cemetery - as one of 12 sites across the country sharing £32m. The grant is to restored heritage features and create a new green community space in the town.

The Berkhamsted Bowmen are the oldest archery club in England.  Founded in 1875 Berkhamsted Cricket Club competes in the Herts League and in 2015 it ran twenty-five separate teams. The club is based at the Berkhamsted Community Cricket and Sports Club, Kitcheners Field, Castle Hill, Berkhamsted. The nine Berkhamsted and Hemel Hempstead Hockey Club teams are based just outside the town at Cow Roast, playing their matches on their astroturf pitch at the club grounds in Cow Roast. There are two Bowls clubs, Berkhamsted and Kitcheners.
 
The town's football club, Berkhamsted FC, play in the Southern Football League Division One Central, part of the 8th Level in the English League (the town's football ground is at Broadwater). The team was formed in 2009 after the demise of Berkhamsted Town FC, which had been established in 1895. Founded in 1996, Berkhamsted Raiders CFC football club was recognised as the FA Charter Standard Community Club of the Year at the English Football Association Community Awards in 2014 and awarded the UEFA Grassroots Silver Award in 2015 for their work across the local community. The club, in 2023, had more than 1,300 affiliated players, including 250 girls in 94 youth teams plus Senior, Veterans, Ladies, Walking Football and Inclusive Football sections. In 2022, the Club was awarded the Herts FA Grassroots Club of the Year  

There is a sports centre off Douglas Gardens, managed by EveryoneActive. The facilities comprise a large indoor multi-purpose sports hall, squash courts, swimming pool and outdoor all-weather pitch. This facility is complemented by dual use of the leisure facilities of Ashlyns School and Berkhamsted Collegiate School. A deficit in leisure space is compounded by a high level of sports participation locally and consequent heavy use of outdoor sports pitches. Berkhamsted and the surrounding area has a variety of road cycling and mountain biking routes, including traffic-free off-road routes in Ashridge Estate. The town was visited by the Tour of Britain in 2014.

Sites of interest
The majority of Berkhamsted's eighty-five listed or scheduled historical sites are on in the high street and the medieval core of the town (a significant number of them contain timber frames). Four are scheduled, one is Grade I, seven are Grade II*, the remaining 75 are Grade II. In addition to the sites noted in the article above (such as the castle and schools) the following structures and locations are of interest:

 173 High Street is a Victorian façade hiding what is considered to be the oldest extant jettied timber-framed building in Great Britain, dated by dendrochronology of structural timbers to between 1277 and 1297. The building was originally thought to have been a jeweller or goldsmith's shop with a workshop behind. It is now believed to have been a jettied service wing to a larger aisled hall house, which has since disappeared. It represents an early example of transition in carpentry technology, from the use of passing braces to crown posts. The 13th century origin of the structure was discovered by chance in 2000 by builders who had begun work on what appeared to be a Victorian property. The shop was, from 1869, Figg's the Chemists; post-restoration (with expertise and a £250,000 grant from English Heritage), the shop is currently used as an estate agency. Dr Simon Thurley, Chief Executive of English Heritage, said "This is an amazing discovery. It gives an extraordinary insight into how Berkhamsted High Street would have looked in medieval times."
 125 High Street, a house and shop opposite St Peter's Church, is a timber-framed building with a wing that is one bay of a 14th-century open hall. This was an unusually large house; its size and central position suggests a manor house or other high status house, possibly supporting the castle. The building underwent extensive alterations in the 17th, 18th and 19th centuries.
 The Swan, 139 High Street, contains the remains of a medieval open hall. Parts of the roof date from the 14th century, and the street range was extended and a chimney stack added c. 1500. It sits on the ancient junction with the old Roman road of Akeman Street (High Street) and the main route between Berkhamsted and Windsor Castle (Chesham Road).
 Castle Street began life as the medieval lane from the town's high street to the drawbridge of the royal castle. At the other end of the lane was the parish church of St Peters. In the 16th century, next to the church, Berkhamsted school was founded, while in the 17th century there were seven public houses among the street's trade outlets.
 To the northwest of Berkhamsted stand the ruins of Marlin's Chapel, a 13th-century chapel next to a medieval fortified farm. The walls and moat surrounding the modern farm still remain and are reputed to be haunted.

 129 High Street is the Grade II* listed house known as Dean Incent's House. (John Incent, Dean of St Paul's, founded Berkhamsted School.) A 15th century half-timbered house, the interior has original exposed timber framing and several Tudor wall paintings. The building incorporates part of an even older structure and was used as public meeting place before the Court House was built. The house is not normally open to the public.
 The Court House, next to the church, dates from the 16th century, and is believed to lie on the site of the medieval court where the Portmote  or Borough Court was held.
 Sayer's Almshouses, were the legacy of John Sayer, chief cook to Charles II, at 235–241 High Street, comprise a single-storey row of almshouses built in 1684.
 The Bourne School, at 222 High Street, was the legacy by Thomas Bourne (1656–1729) (Master of the Company of Framework Knitters) to build a charity school in Berkhamsted for 20 boys and 10 girls. The front was rebuilt in 1854 in Jacobean-style red brick; it is not clear if any part of the building predates 1854. In 1875, the pupils were transferred to the National School and the funds used for scholarships.
 The site now occupied by the Pennyfarthing Hotel dates from the 16th century, having been a monastic building used as accommodation for religious guests passing through Berkhamsted or going to the monastery at Ashridge.
 Berkhamsted Town Hall, a Victorian gothic market house and town hall, designed by architect Edward Buckton Lamb (built in 1859, extended in 1890, restored in 1983–1999), was built by public subscription from Berkhamstedians. It comprised a market hall (now the Copper House restaurant), a large assembly hall and rooms for the Mechanics' Institute. When Berkhamsted became part of the new Dacorum Borough Council (based in Hemel Hempstead), there were plans to demolish the building, these plans were stopped by a ten-year citizens' campaign during the 1970s and 1980s, which eventually ended at the High Court.

 The Berkhamsted Canadian totem pole sits adjacent to the canal, close to Castle Street Bridge. In the early 1960s, Roger Alsford, a great-grandson of the founder of the timber company, James Alsford (1841–1912), went to work at the Tahsis lumber mill on Vancouver Island. During a strike, he was rescued from starvation by a local Kwakiutl community. Alsford's brother, William John Alsford, visited the island, and in gratitude for the local people's hospitality, commissioned a totem pole from the Canadian First Nations artist Henry Hunt. The completed pole was shipped to Britain and erected at Alsford's Wharf in 1968. Alsford's warehouses were replaced in 1994 by a private housing development which limit access to the pole, so that it can be viewed only at a distance from the public road. It is one of only a handful of totem poles in the United Kingdom, others being on display at the British Museum and Horniman Museum in London, Windsor Great Park, Bushy Park and the Yorkshire Sculpture Park. The carvings on the totem pole represent four figures from First Nations legend: at the top sits Raven, the trickster and creator deity; he sits on the head of Sunman, who has outstretched arms representing the rays of the sun and wears a copper (a type of ceremonial shield); Sunman stands on the fearsome witch-spirit Dzunukwa; at the base is the two-headed warrior sea serpent, Sisiutl, who has up-stretched wings.
 Ashridge is a country estate and stately home. Ashridge House is a large Gothic Revival country house built between 1808 and 1814. Since 2015 it has been the home of Hult International Business School's Ashridge Executive Education programme (see above for more information about the building). Ashridge has been featured many times in film and television series due to its distinction as an area of natural beauty. Scenes were filmed for Sleepy Hollow at Golden Valley and Harry Potter and the Goblet of Fire at Ashridge's ancient Frithsden Beeches Wood. The climbable monument to Francis Egerton, 3rd Duke of Bridgewater, a tall Doric column with urn (a Grade II* listed building), stands in a grove within Ashridge.

Associations with the town

Twin towns

Berkhamsted is twinned with:
  Beaune, Burgundy, France
  Neu Isenburg, Hesse, Germany (as part of Dacorum)

The town also has an informal relationship with Barkhamsted, Connecticut, in the United States. The latter presented a gavel and block on 4 July 1976, the U.S. bicentennial, which Berkhamsted Town Council now uses in meetings.

Footnotes

References

Sources

 
(see also Birtchnell, Percy (1975) Bygone Berkhamsted. Luton: White Crescent Press )

External links

 Berkhamsted Town Council
 Berkhamsted Local History & Museum Society
 The above society's Collection of Old Photographs of Berkhamsted and its citizens
 Dacorum Heritage Trust

 
Dacorum
Towns in Hertfordshire
Civil parishes in Hertfordshire
Market towns